The Brabham BT44 was a Formula One racing car designed by Gordon Murray, Brabham's chief designer.

Design 
An update of the partially successful BT42 of 1973, the BT44 was a simple design with a standard Ford DFV/Hewland gearbox combination, but was very clean aerodynamically. Murray had an eye for clean lines, and the BT44 was particularly graceful. He was also a forward thinker, and tinkered with side skirts and airdams on the car, a precursor to ground effects aerodynamics.

Sponsorship came from Martini.

Racing history

1974 

The 1974 season was successful for Brabham. Carlos Reutemann took three wins with the car, partnered by Carlos Pace who was able to string a series of promising results together. Brabham finished at a fighting fifth place in the Constructor's Championship after a closely fought season.

1975 
The BT44 was modified for 1975, and Pace won his first and only Grand Prix at his home event in Brazil, while Reutemann won at the Nürburgring. A series of other strong finishes helped Reutemann to finish third in the drivers' championship in 1975, whilst Brabham equalled his feat in the constructors' championship by finishing second. Whilst the BT44 was a good car, it couldn't match the McLaren M23 or the Ferrari 312T.

1976 

The BT44 was replaced by the Alfa Romeo powered BT45 for 1976 which proved to be a serious step back for the team. The BT44Bs were sold to RAM Racing, who ran them for a variety of drivers in the 1976 World Championship, including Loris Kessel, Emilio de Villota, Patrick Nève, Jac Nellemann, Damien Magee, Lella Lombardi and Bob Evans, none of whom had much success.

Formula One World Championship results
(key) (results in bold indicate pole position, results in italics indicate fastest lap)

 Includes 1 point scored using a Brabham BT42.

See also
 Tyrrell P34
 Lotus 72

References

Brabham Formula One cars
1974 Formula One season cars
1975 Formula One season cars
1976 Formula One season cars